The 2017 UCI Europe Tour was the thirteenth season of the UCI Europe Tour. The 2017 season began on 26 January 2017 with the Trofeo Santanyí-Ses Salines-Campos and ended on 17 October 2017 with the Nationale Sluitingsprijs.

Belgian rider Baptiste Planckaert, who scored 1,605 points in the 2016 edition, was the defending champion of the UCI Europe Tour.

Nacer Bouhanni won the overall standings for the second time in three years;  won the team classification, while France won both the overall nations' title and the under-23 equivalent.

Race structure
Throughout the season, points are awarded to the top finishers of stages within stage races and the final general classification standings of each of the stages races and one-day events. The quality and complexity of a race also determines how many points are awarded to the top finishers, the higher the UCI rating of a race, the more points are awarded.

The UCI ratings from highest to lowest are as follows:
 Multi-day events: 2.HC, 2.1 and 2.2
 One-day events: 1.HC, 1.1 and 1.2

Events

January

February

March

April

May

June

July

August

September

October

Final standings
For the 2017 season, the standings are calculated based upon the UCI World Ranking, with the ranking period being the previous 52 weeks.

Individual classification

Teams classification

Nations classification

Nations under-23 classification

References

External links
 

 
UCI Europe Tour
UCI
UCI Europe Tour